Major-General Zeya Aung (also spelt Zeyar Aung and Zayar Aung) is a military officer and a former Minister of Construction. He was appointed by President Thein Sein in August 2013, following the transfer of his predecessor, Than Htay, by presidential order, on 25 July 2013. He previously served as Minister of Rail Transportation from September 2012 to July 2013.

Military career 
A military officer, Zeya Aung graduated from the 23rd intake of the Defence Services Academy.

In 2007, he was appointed as commandant of the Defence Services Academy. He served as a commander of the Northern Command from August 2010 to September 2012, as well as a former Commander of the Light Infantry Division (LID) 88.

Personal life 
Zeya Aung is the brother-in-law of Ye Htut, and an uncle of Jonathan Kyaw Thaung of the KT Group, a local conglomerate.

References

Transport ministers of Myanmar
Energy ministers of Myanmar
Communication ministers of Myanmar
Information ministers of Myanmar
Living people
Year of birth missing (living people)